Pertwee is a surname. People with this name include:

Pertwee family of English actors/writers

Roland Pertwee (1885–1963), English writer and actor, father of Jon and Michael and uncle of Bill
Michael Pertwee (1916–1991), English playwright 
Jon Pertwee (1919–1996), English actor best known as Doctor Who, father of Sean
Bill Pertwee (1926–2013), English actor best known as the ARP Warden in Dad's Army
Sean Pertwee (born 1964), English actor

English-language surnames
Surnames of English origin